Montbello is a neighborhood in the northeastern section City and County of Denver, Colorado. Montbello is one of Denver's largest neighborhoods, with over 9,000 housing units, and over 30,000 residents.

Neighborhood facts 
Montbello began as a suburban-style development by real estate developer Jordon Perlmutter, the first major annexation of privately owned land to the far northeast area of Denver, taking place in September, 1965. The annexation included almost 3,000 acres of land and plans for the area to develop into a mixed use community and dictated the general land use and densities and provided for the necessary public land sites for parks, schools, and other public facilities. Developers built a large variety of homes, ranging from small soap-box ranches, to large multi-level family homes.

During the boom of the late 1990s and early 2000s, real estate prices in this ZIP code were high and in sync with the rest of metro Denver.

There are several schools in the neighborhood, including Montbello High School, which opened in 1980. Schools in this area have struggled in the past with performance, but community members and the school district are working together to address these issues. There are six elementary schools, one k-8, and a middle school.

Neighborhood Organizations 
Far Northeast Neighbors

Montbello 20/20

Montbello Organizing Committee

Steps to Success
Montbello Neighborhood Improvement Association

Location 
The neighborhood lies north of I-70 and was isolated from the rest of Denver by Stapleton International Airport, now under redevelopment. To the north of Montbello is the Rocky Mountain Arsenal National Wildlife Refuge, a Superfund site formerly used for the manufacturing of chemical weaponry. After Denver’s annexation of the Denver International Airport site even further northeast, the neighborhood has occupied a more “central” location in the city.

The racial makeup of the neighborhood (although this is over 100% and adds up to 102.97%) is 4.12% White, 43.35% African American, 1.67% Asian, and 53.83% Hispanic or Latino.

References

External links 
Housing foreclosures
Builder Primack left footprint in Denver area

1966 establishments in Colorado
Populated places established in 1966
Neighborhoods in Denver